Mexicana Universal Querétaro is a pageant in Querétaro, Mexico, that selects that state's representative for the national Mexicana Universal pageant.

In 2004 was not sent to a State Representative.

The State Organization hasn't had a national winner in Nuestra Belleza México.

Titleholders
Below are the names of the annual titleholders of Nuestra Belleza Querétaro 1994-2016, Mexicana Universal Querétaro 2017, and their final placements in the Mexicana Universal.

 Competed in Miss Universe.
 Competed in Miss International.
 Competed in Miss Charm International.
 Competed in Miss Continente Americano.
 Competed in Reina Hispanoamericana.
 Competed in Miss Orb International.
 Competed in Nuestra Latinoamericana Universal.

Designated contestants
As of 2000, isn't uncommon for some States to have more than one delegate competing simultaneously in the national pageant. The following Nuestra Belleza Querétaro contestants were invited to compete in Nuestra Belleza México.

External links
Official Website

Nuestra Belleza México